Pepito Chickeeto is a Walter Lantz cartoon animal character, who made his first and only appearance in the cartoon "The Bongo Punch", in 1957.

List of appearances
The Bongo Punch (12/30/1957)

See also
List of Walter Lantz cartoons
List of Walter Lantz cartoon characters

References

External links 
 
 The Walter Lantz-o-Pedia

Fictional anthropomorphic characters
Universal Pictures cartoons and characters
Walter Lantz Productions shorts
Fictional chickens
Film characters introduced in 1957
Walter Lantz Productions cartoons and characters